This is a list of aircraft in alphabetical order beginning with 'Go - Gz'.

Go-Gz

Goair 
 Goair GT-1 Trainer

Gobosh Aviation
(Moline, IL)
Gobosh 700S
Gobosh 800XP

Godbille 
(Jean Godbille / Jacques and Jean Godbille)
 Godbille JG.1B
 Godbille GJJ

Goddard 
(Norman A Goddard, San Diego and Imperial, CA)
 Goddard Essie-V
 Goddard 1927 Monoplane

Gödecker 
(Jacob Gödecker]]
 Gödecker B type
 Gödecker flugboote

GoFly
(GoFly Aeronatique)
 GoFly Gotar

Gohin 
(Christian Gohin)
 Gohin CG.01

Gohn 
(Alfred A Gohn, E Warren, PA)
 Gohn A

Golasky 
(Adolph Golasky, Rising Sun School of Aeronautics, Collegeville, PA)
 Golasky G2-1

Golden Arrow 
(Golden Arrow Aircraft Co, Columbus, OH)
 Golden Arrow Sport

Golden Car 
(Golden Car SpA, Caramagna Piemonte, Italy)
 Golden Car Brio
 Golden Car F30

Golden Circle Air 
(Golden Circle Air, Inc., De Soto, IA)
 Golden Circle Air T-Bird

Golden Eagle 
(Golden Eagle Aircraft Corp, Port Columbus, OH)
 Golden Eagle ROBC Sport
 Golden Eagle C-5
 Golden Eagle Chief
 Golden Eagle Junbior Pursuit

Golden Gate Aviation
Golden Gate Mosquito

Goldwing Ltd
Goldwing Ltd Goldwing

Golubkov 
 Golubkov SRB

Gonserkevis 
(Al J Gonserkevis, Sevell, NJ)
 Gonserkevis Cherokee

Gonzales 
(Arthur and Willie Gonzales, 435 16th Ave, San Francisco, CA)
 Gonzales 1912 Biplane

González Gil-Pazó 
(Arturo González Gil y Santibañez and José Pazó)
 González Gil-Pazó No.1
 González Gil-Pazó GP-1
 González Gil-Pazó GP-2
 González Gil-Pazó GP-4

Goodland 
(Goodland Aviation Co, Goodland, KS)
 Goodland 1909 Aeroplane

Goodman 
(Claude Goodman, Wilmington, NC)
 Goodman 1927 Monoplane

Goodsell 
(Vernon Goodsell)
 Goodsell XP-Talon

FL Goodwin
(Phoenix, AZ)
Goodwin Buckshot
Goodwin Tri-Moto

Goodyear 
(Goodyear Aerospace Corp.)

 Goodyear FG Corsair
 Goodyear F2G Corsair
 Goodyear GA-1 Duck
 Goodyear GA-2 Duck
 Goodyear GA-22 Drake
 Goodyear GA-33 Inflatoplane
 Goodyear GA-400R Gizmo
 Goodyear GA-447 Inflatoplane
 Goodyear GA-466 Inflatoplane
 Goodyear GA-468 Inflatoplane
 Goodyear AO-2 Inflatoplane
 Goodyear AO-3 Inflatoplane

Goodyear Lighter than Air Craft
 Goodyear Defender
 Goodyear Enterprise
 Goodyear Pilgrim
 Goodyear Rainbow
 Goodyear Ranger
 Goodyear Reliance
 Goodyear Resolute
 Goodyear Type AD
 Goodyear C3
 Goodyear Caquot P
 Goodyear Caquot R
 Goodyear EZ
 Goodyear GZ-19
 Goodyear GZ-20
 Goodyear GZ-21
 Goodyear GZ-22
 Goodyear B
 Goodyear C
 Goodyear D
 Goodyear E
 Goodyear EZ-1B
 Goodyear F
 Goodyear G
 Goodyear H
 Goodyear J
 Goodyear K
 Goodyear L
 Goodyear M
 Goodyear N
 Goodyear O
 Goodyear R
 Goodyear RS-1
 Goodyear NFG
 Goodyear OB-1
 Goodyear SZ
 Goodyear TC
 Goodyear Type TZ
 Goodyear XZWG
 Goodyear ZF
 Goodyear ZGS
 Goodyear ZGT
 Goodyear ZK
 Goodyear ZP2N-1W
 Goodyear ZPG-2W
 Goodyear ZPG-3W
 Goodyear ZNN-G
 Goodyear ZNN-L
 Goodyear ZNP-K
 Goodyear ZNP-M
 Goodyear ZPG
 Goodyear ZPK
 Goodyear ZP2K
 Goodyear ZP3K
 Goodyear ZP4K
 Goodyear ZP5K
 Goodyear ZPM
 Goodyear ZP2M
 Goodyear ZPN
 Goodyear ZP2N
 Goodyear ZRS-4 Akron
 Goodyear ZRS-5 Macon
 Goodyear ZS2G
 Goodyear ZSG

Göppingen 
(Sportflugzeugbau Göppingen Martin Schempp became Sportflugzeugbau Schempp-Hirth)
 Göppingen Gö 1 Wolf I sailplane, 1935
 Göppingen Gö 3 Minimoa sailplane, 1936
 Göppingen Gö 4 sailplane
 Göppingen Gö 5 sailplane, 1937
 Göppingen Gö 8
 Göppingen Gö 9 development aircraft for Do 335 Pfeil

Gorbunov 
 Gorbunov GSh
 Gorbunov 105

Gordon 
(Frank Gordon dba The Airplane Factory, Los Molinos and Red Bluff, CA)
 Gordon A-3

Gordon 
(Premier Aircraft Constructions Ltd.)
 Gordon Dove

Gosport
(Gosport Aircraft Company Limited)
 Gosport Shrimp
 Gosport patrol flying boat
 Gosport touring flying boat
 Gosport mail flying boat
 Gosport Fire-Fighter 10-seat flying boat
 Gosport Popular 2-seat touring flying boat
 Gosport G.5
 Gosport G.5a
 Gosport G.8
 Gosport G.8a
 Gosport G.9

Götaverken
(AB Götaverken)
 Götaverken GV 38

Gotch & Brundage 
(Gus Gotch & Tom Brundage, Dycer Airport, Los Angeles, CA)
 Gotch & Brundage Special (a.k.a. Mason Meteor)

Gotha 
(Gothaer Waggonfabrik A,G, Gotha)
 Gotha A.I
 Gotha B.I
 Gotha B.II
 Gotha G.I
 Gotha G.II
 Gotha G.III
 Gotha G.IV
 Gotha G.V
 Gotha G.VI
 Gotha G.VII
 Gotha G.VIII
 Gotha G.IX
 Gotha G.X
 Gotha Go 145
 Gotha Go 146
 Gotha Go 147
 Gotha Go 148
 Gotha Go 149
 Gotha Go 150
 Gotha Go 229
 Gotha Go 229
 Gotha Go 241
 Gotha Go 242
 Gotha Go 244
 Gotha Go 245
 Gotha Go 267
 Gotha Go 345
 Gotha Ka 430
 Gotha LD.1
 Gotha LD.1a
 Gotha LD.2
 Gotha LD.3
 Gotha LD.4
 Gotha LD.5
 Gotha LD.6
 Gotha LD.7
 Gotha LD.10
 Gotha LE.1
 Gotha LE.2
 Gotha LE.3
 Gotha WD.1
 Gotha WD.2
 Gotha WD.2a
 Gotha WD.3
 Gotha WD.4
 Gotha WD.5
 Gotha WD.7
 Gotha WD.8
 Gotha WD.9
 Gotha WD.11
 Gotha WD.12
 Gotha WD.13
 Gotha WD.14
 Gotha WD.15
 Gotha WD.20
 Gotha WD.22
 Gotha WD.27
 Gotha Ursinus UWD

Gould, Content & Loening 
 Gould, Content & Loening 1909 Biplane

Goupy 
(Louis Ambroise Goupy)
 Goupy Type A
 Goupy Type AA
 Goupy Type B
 Goupy Type Militaire
 Goupy Biplan 1911
 Goupy Hydroaeroplane
 Goupy Ibis
 Goupy I
 Goupy II
 Goupy III
 Goupy 1913 single-seat biplane

Gourdou-Leseurre 
 Gourdou-Leseurre Type A a.k.a. GL 1
 Gourdou-Leseurre Type B a.k.a. GL 2
 Gourdou-Leseurre Type B1 a.k.a. GL 2
 Gourdou-Leseurre Type B2 a.k.a. GL 21
 Gourdou-Leseurre Type B3 a.k.a. GL 22
 Gourdou-Leseurre Type B4 a.k.a. GL 23
 Gourdou-Leseurre Type B5 a.k.a. GL 22 ET
 Gourdou-Leseurre Type B6 a.k.a. GL 24
 Gourdou-Leseurre Type B7 a.k.a. GL 25
 Gourdou-Leseurre Type C
 Gourdou-Leseurre Type D
 Gourdou-Leseurre Type E
 Gourdou-Leseurre Type F a.k.a. GL 50
 Gourdou-Leseurre Type G a.k.a. GL 40
 Gourdou-Leseurre Type H a.k.a. GL 50
 Gourdou-Leseurre Type I a.k.a. GL 31
 Gourdou-Leseurre Type I1 a.k.a. GL I
 Gourdou-Leseurre Type I2 a.k.a. GL I2
 Gourdou-Leseurre Type I3 a.k.a. GL 31
 Gourdou-Leseurre Type J
 Gourdou-Leseurre Type K
 Gourdou-Leseurre Type L
 Gourdou-Leseurre Type L1
 Gourdou-Leseurre Type L2
 Gourdou-Leseurre Type L3
 Gourdou-Leseurre Type M
 Gourdou-Leseurre Type M1
 Gourdou-Leseurre Type M2
 Gourdou-Leseurre GL.1
 Gourdou-Leseurre GL.2
 Gourdou-Leseurre GL.21
 Gourdou-Leseurre GL.22
 Gourdou-Leseurre GL.23
 Gourdou-Leseurre GL.24
 Gourdou-Leseurre GL.24X
 Gourdou-Leseurre GL.30
 Gourdou-Leseurre GL.31
 Gourdou-Leseurre LGL.32
 Gourdou-Leseurre LGL.321
 Gourdou-Leseurre LGL.323
 Gourdou-Leseurre LGL.324
 Gourdou-Leseurre LGL.33
 Gourdou-Leseurre LGL.34
 Gourdou-Leseurre LGL.341
 Gourdou-Leseurre LGL.351
 Gourdou-Leseurre LGL.390
 Gourdou-Leseurre GL.410
 Gourdou-Leseurre GL.430
 Gourdou-Leseurre GL.432
 Gourdou-Leseurre GL.450
 Gourdou-Leseurre GL.482
 Gourdou-Leseurre GL.50
 Gourdou-Leseurre GL.51
 Gourdou-Leseurre GL.521
 Gourdou-Leseurre GL.60
 Gourdou-Leseurre GL.633
 Gourdou-Leseurre GL.810 HY
 Gourdou-Leseurre GL.811 HY
 Gourdou-Leseurre GL.812 HY
 Gourdou-Leseurre GL.813 HY
 Gourdou-Leseurre GL.820 HY
 Gourdou-Leseurre GL.821 HY
 Gourdou-Leseurre GL.823 HY
 Gourdou-Leseurre GL.831 HY
 Gourdou-Leseurre GL.832 HY

Gowland
 Gowland Jenny Wren

Gracey 
(William Gracey, Niagara Falls, NY)
 Gracey 1911 Biplane

Gradient sro
(Prague, Czech Republic)
Gradient Agility
Gradient Aspen
Gradient Avax
Gradient BiGolden
Gradient BiOnyx
Gradient Bliss
Gradient Bright
Gradient Delite
Gradient Denali
Gradient Eiger
Gradient Freestyle
Gradient Golden
Gradient Montana
Gradient Nevada

Graf von Saurma-Jeltsch-Vogt
(Graf von Saurma-Jeltsch & Alfred Vogt)
 Graf von Saurma-Jeltsch - Vogt Milan

Graham-Perren 
(George Graham & Charles Perren Jr, Waukesha, WI)
 Graham-Perren Racer
 Graham-Perren 1933 Monoplane

Grahame-White
 Grahame-White Baby
 Grahame-White Bantam
 Grahame-White Naval and Military Biplane
 Grahame-White E.IV Ganymede bomber
 Grahame-White E.7
 Grahame-White E.8 Aero-Limousine
 Grahame-White E.9 Ganymede airliner
 Grahame-White Type VI
 Grahame-White Type X Charabanc
 Grahame-White Type XI
 Grahame-White Type XIII
 Grahame-White Type XV
 Grahame-White Type 18
 Grahame-White G.W.19

Grandjean 
(Daniel Grandjean)
 Grandjean DG.01 Alcyon

Grandjean 
(René Grandjean)
 Grandjean L-1

Granville 
(Edward Granville, Springfield, MA)
 Granville Mono

Granville 
(Robert Granville, Springfield, MA)
 Granville Bee Gee Baby

Granville Brothers Aircraft (Gee Bee)
(Granville Brothers (Edward, Mark, Robert, Thomas, Zantford) Aircraft, Springfield, MA )
 Granville Gee Bee Model A
 Granville Gee Bee Model B Sportster
 Granville Gee Bee Model C Sportster
 Granville Gee Bee Model C-4 Fourster
 Granville Gee Bee Model C-6 Sixster
 Granville Gee Bee Model C-8 Eightster
 Granville Gee Bee Model D Sportster
 Granville Gee Bee Model E Sportster
 Granville Gee Bee Model F Sportster
 Granville Gee Bee Model Q Ascender
 Granville Gee Bee Model R Super Sportster
 Granville Gee Bee Model R-6C QED - Conqueror engine
 Granville Gee Bee Model R-6H QED - Hornet engine
 Granville Gee Bee Model X Sportster
 Granville Gee Bee Model Y Senior Sportster
 Granville Gee Bee Model Z Super Sportster

Gratsianski
(Alexei Nikolayevich Gratsianski)
 Gratsiansky Omega (built at khAI)

Gravereau 
(Daniel Gravereau & J.P. Drouillard)
 Gravereau GD.200 Gladiateur

Grawert
(Fritz Grawert)
 Grawert flugboote

Gray 
((Earl T) Gray & (Birney) Taliaferro, 1815 N Van Ness, Los Angeles, CA)
 Gray BT-1

Gray 
(Shadetree Aviation Inc, Carson City, NV)
 Gray Special

Gray goose 
(Gray Goose Airways (fdr: Jonathan E Caldwell), Denver, CO)
 Gray Goose Cyclogyro
 Gray Goose Windmill Plane

Grays Harbor 
 Grays Harbor Activian

Greisch-Thuet
(Charles Greisch & Thuet)
 Greisch-Thuet Parasol

Great Lakes 
 Great Lakes BG
 Great Lakes B2G
 Great Lakes TG
 Great Lakes XSG
 Great Lakes TBG
 Great Lakes Sport Trainer
 Great Lakes 2-S-W
 Great Lakes 2-T-1
 Great Lakes 2-T-2 Speedster
 Great Lakes 4-A-1
 Great Lakes 41
 Great Lakes TG-1 Commercial
 Great Lakes X
 Great lakes XPT-930 (a.k.a. Model 41)

Great Plains Aircraft 
 Great Plains Aircraft Easy Eagle

Great Western
(Great Western Airways Inc, Los Angeles, CA)
 Great Western XB-1

Green Sky Adventures 
(Ed Fisher)
 Green Sky Adventures Micro Mong
 Green Sky Zippy Sport
 Green Sky Micro Mong 2XF

Greenapples 
(Greenapples Aircraft (Fdr: L Gale Abels), Boulder, CO)
 Greenapples AT-19

Greene 
(Dr William Greene)
 Greene 1901 Biplane
 Greene 1909 Biplane

Greene 
(Greene Composite Type Aircraft Corp, 111 Sutter St, San Francisco, CA)
 Greene 1929 Aeroplane

Greenwalt 
(Wilmer W Greenwalt (or Greenawalt), Detroit, MI)
 Greenwalt Burco Sport

Greenwood
(Marvin Greenwood)
Greenwood Witch

Greenwood-Yates 
(North Pacific Aircraft Corp (founders: Allan D Greenwood & George Yates), Seattle, WA)
 Greenwood-Yates Bicraft

Grega 
(John W Grega, Bedford, OH)
 Grega GN-1 Aircamper

Gregg 
(Gregg Aircraft Mfg Co, Pueblo, CO)
 Gregg A-75

Gregor
(Michael Gregor, Roosevelt Field, NY)
 Gregor FDB-1
 Gregor GR-1 Sportplane
 Gregor GR-1 Continental
 Gregor GR-2

Greisch-Thuet 
 Greisch-Thuet 1937 monoplane

Grenet 
(Pierre Grenet)
 Grenet G.47
 Grenet PG.2 Bison

Gribovsky 
(Vladimir Gribovsky)
 Gribovsky G-3
 Gribovsky G-4
 Gribovsky G-5
 Gribovsky G-8
 Gribovsky G-10
 Gribovsky G-11
 Gribovsky G-11M
 Gribovsky G-15
 Gribovsky G-20
 Gribovsky G-21
 Gribovsky G-22
 Gribovsky G-23
 Gribovsky G-25
 Gribovsky G-26
 Gribovsky G-27
 Gribovsky G-28
 Gribovsky G-29
 Gribovsky G-30
 Gribovsky Dosav

Grif
(Grif, Castel Sant'Elia, Italy)
Grif Eos
Grif H2000

Griffon 
(Griffon Aerospace Inc, Huntsville, AL)
 Griffon Lionheart

Grigorov
(Atanas Grigorov)
 Grigorov-1 named Leitenant Liapchev

Grigorovich 
(Dmitry Pavlovich Grigorovich)
 Grigorovich DG-52
 Grigorovich DG-53
 Grigorovich DG-56
 Grigorovich DG-58
 Grigorovich DI-3
 Grigorovich E-2
 Grigorovich GASN
 Grigorovich I-1
 Grigorovich I-2
 Grigorovich I-5
 Grigorovich I-9
 Grigorovich I-10
 Grigorovich I-Z
 Grigorovich IP-1
 Grigorovich IP-2
 Grigorovich IP-4
 Grigorovich LK-3
 Grigorovich LSh
 Grigorovich M-1
 Grigorovich M-2
 Grigorovich M-3
 Grigorovich M-4
 Grigorovich M-5
 Grigorovich M-6
 Grigorovich M-7
 Grigorovich M-8
 Grigorovich M-9
 Grigorovich M-10
 Grigorovich M-11
 Grigorovich M-12
 Grigorovich M-13
 Grigorovich M-14
 Grigorovich M-15
 Grigorovich M-16
 Grigorovich M-17
 Grigorovich M-18
 Grigorovich M-19
 Grigorovich M-20
 Grigorovich M-21
 Grigorovich M-22
 Grigorovich M-24
 Grigorovich M-24bis
 Grigorovich ROM-1
 Grigorovich ROM-2
 Grigorovich MK-1
 Grigorovich MRL
 Grigorovich MR-2
 Grigorovich MR-3
 Grigorovich MR-5
 Grigorovich MT
 Grigorovich MUR-1
 Grigorovich MU-2
 Grigorovich MUR-2
 Grigorovich IP-1
 Grigorovich PB-1
 Grigorovich Stal-MAI
 Grigorovich SUVP
 Grigorovich TB-5
 Grigorovich TSh-1
 Grigorovich TSh-2

Grinnell-Robinson 
(Grinnell Aeroplane Co (fdr: William C "Nilly" Robinson), Grinnell, IA)
 Grinnell-Robinson 1916 Biplane
 Grinnell-Robinson 1915 Scout

Grinvalds 
(Jean Grinvalds)
 Grinvalds G.801 Orion
 Grinvalds G.802 Orion

Grizodubov
(Stepan Vasilyevich Grizodubov)
 Grizodubov No.1 (Wright copy)
 Grizodubov No.2
 Grizodubov No.3
 Grizodubov No.4 1912 monoplane
 Grizodubov 1940 powered glider

Grob 
(Burkhart Grob / Grob Aerospace / Grob Aircraft)

 Grob G 102 Astir, Astir Jeans, Astir 77, Astir Club
 Grob G 103 Twin, Twin II, Twin II Acro, Twin III
 Grob G 109
 Grob G 110
 Grob G 111
 Grob G 112
 Grob G 115
 Grob G 116
 Grob G 120
 Grob G 140
 Grob GF 200
 Grob G 520 Egrett / Strato 1
 Grob Ranger
 Grob Strato 2C
 Grob Tutor
 Grob Vigilant

Groen 
(Groen Brothers Aviation, Salt Lake City, UT, 2001: Glendale, AZ)
 Groen Hawk I
 Groen Hawk II
 Groen Hawk 4
 Groen Hawk V
 Groen Jet Hawk 4T
 Groen Heliplane
 Groen GyroLiner
 Groen GyroLifter
 DARPA Heliplane
 Groen ArrowHawk
 Groen ShadowHawk
 Groen Hawk Point Five
 Groen Hawk 1
 Groen H2X
 Groen RevCon 6-X

Grokhovskii 
 Grokhovskii Inflatable
 Grokhovskii Kukuracha
 Grokhovskii G-26
 Grokhovskii G-31
 Grokhovskii G-37
 Grokhovskii G-38
 Grokhovskii LK-2
 Grokhovskii G-61
 Grokhovskii G-63
 Grokhovskii GN-4
 Grokhovskii GN-8

Gropp
( Herbert Gropp)
 Gropp Zaunkönig

Groppius 
 Groppius GAZ-5

Groppo 
(Ing Nando Groppo srl)
 Groppo XL
 Groppo Trial

Gros-Bredelet
(Louis Gros and James Bredelet)
 Gros-bredelet GB-01

Gross 
(John Gross)
 Gross JG-2

Grosso Aircraft 
 Grosso Aircraft Easy Eagle 1

Grudieaire 
 Grudieaire GH-4

Grulich
(Karl Grulich / Deutsche Aero LLoyd)
 Fokker-Grulich F.II
 Fokker-Grulich F.III
 Grulich S.1

Grumman 
 Grumman A-6 Intruder
 Grumman A-9 Goose
 Grumman A-12 Duck
 Grumman A-13 Goose
 Grumman A-14 Widgeon
 Grumman A-16 Albatross
 Grumman AF Guardian
 Grumman AO-1 Mohawk
 Grumman A2F Intruder
 Grumman C-1 Trader
 Grumman C-2 Greyhound
 Grumman C-4
 Grumman C-11
 Grumman C-103
 Grumman E-1 Tracer
 Grumman E-2 Hawkeye
 Grumman EA-6 Prowler
 Grumman F-9 Cougar
 Grumman F-11 Tiger
 Grumman F-14 Tomcat
 Grumman F-111
 Grumman F-111 Aardvark
 Grumman F-111B Interceptor
 Grumman FF Fifi
 Grumman F2F
 Grumman F3F
 Grumman F4F Wildcat
 Grumman F5F Skyrocket
 Grumman F6F Hellcat
 Grumman F7F Tigercat
 Grumman F8F Bearcat
 Grumman F9F Panther
 Grumman F9F Cougar
 Grumman F10F Jaguar
 Grumman F11F Tiger
 Grumman F11F-1F Super Tiger
 Grumman F12F
 Grumman Future Air Attack Vehicle
 Grumman JF Duck
 Grumman J2F Duck
 Grumman J3F Goose
 Grumman J4F Widgeon
 Grumman JRF Goose
 Grumman JR2F Albatross
 Grumman Model 623
 Grumman OA-9 Goose
 Grumman OA-12 Duck
 Grumman OA-13 Goose
 Grumman OA-14 Widgeon
 Grumman OF Mohawk
 Grumman OV-1 Mohawk
 Grumman P-50
 Grumman P-65
 Grumman S-2 Tracker
 Grumman SF
 Grumman S2F Tracker
 Grumman SBF
 Grumman TBF Avenger
 Grumman TB2F
 Grumman TB3F
 Grumman TBM-3W Avenger
 Grumman TF Trader
 Grumman TSF
 Grumman HU-16 Albatross
 Grumman UF Albatross
 Grumman WF
 Grumman W2F
 Grumman X-29
 Grumman AXG
 Grumman Navy Experimental Type G Carrier Fighter
 Grumman American AA-1B Trainer
 Grumman American AA-5 Traveler
 Grumman American AA-5A Cheetah
 Grumman American AA-5B Tiger
 Grumman American GA-7 Cougar
 Grumman American Tr-2
 American General AG-5B Tiger
 Grumman Goblin
 Grumman G-3
 Grumman G-5
 Grumman G-6
 Grumman G-7
 Grumman G-8
 Grumman G-10
 Grumman G-11
 Grumman G-15
 Grumman G-16
 Grumman G-18
 Grumman G-20
 Grumman G-21 Goose
 Grumman G-22 Gulfhawk II
 Grumman G-23
 Grumman G-32 Gulfhawk III
 Grumman G-34
 Grumman G-36
 Grumman G-44 Widgeon
 Grumman G-50
 Grumman G-51
 Grumman G-52
 Grumman G-58 Bearcat
 Grumman G-63 Kitten
 Grumman G-65 Tadpole
 Grumman G-66 XTSF
 Grumman G-72 Kitten II
 Grumman G-73 Mallard
 Grumman G-75 Panther
 Grumman G-79
 Grumman G-81
 Grumman G-83
 Grumman G-89
 Grumman G-93
 Grumman G-98
 Grumman G-98J
 Grumman G-99
 Grumman G-118
 Grumman G-134
 Grumman G-159 Gulfstream I
 Grumman G-1159 Gulfstream II
 Grumman G-164 Ag-Cat
 Grumman G-303 Tomcat
 Grumman GG
 Grumman Gulfstream II
 Grumman Gulfstream III
 Grumman Gulfstream IV
 Grumman LXG1
 Grumman CSR-110 Albatross RCAF / Canadian Armed Forces
 Grumman CP-121 Tracker RCN / Canadian Armed Forces
 Grumman CS2F Tracker RCN

Gruse 
(Maschinenfabrik August Gruse)
 Gruse Bo 15/1

Grushin 
 Sh-Tandem
 BB-MAI
 Gr-1
 IS

Grzmilas
(Tadeusz Grzmilas)
 Grzmilas Orkan II

GT-Gyroplanes
(GT-Gyroplanes P/L, Moama, New South Wales, Australia)
GT-Gyroplanes Kruza

Guangzhou Orlando Helicopters
 Guangzhou (Orlando) Panda

Guarani
(AeroTalleres Guarani SrL / Joseph Repka and Walter Kusy Fagundez)
 Guarani Paraguay 1

Guardian 
(Guardian Aircraft Co (Pres: Derek White), 3008 S Jefferson Ave, St Louis, MO)
 Guardian 200

Gudkov 
 Gudkov K-37
 Gudkov Gu-82
 Gudkov Gu-1
 Gudkov Gu-37

Guédon
 Guédon Monoplan

Guelton 
(Humbert Guelton)
 Guelton HG.2

Guépard II
(Guépard II Team)
 Guépard II XJ01

Guerchais 
 Guerchais 5
 Guerchais 6
 Guerchais 9
 Guerchais 12
 Guerchais Stratosphere

Guerchais-Henriot 
(Louis Guerchais & Henriot)
 Guerchais-Henriot T-2

Guerchais-Roche 
(Louis Guerchais & François Roche / Établissements Roche-Aviation)
 Guerchais-Roche T.25
 Guerchais-Roche T-30
 Guerchais-Roche T-35
 Guerchais-Roche T-35/I
 Guerchais-Roche T-35-II
 Guerchais-Roche T-39
 Guerchais-Roche T-39-II
 Guerchais-Roche T-55
 Guerchais-Roche GR-70
 Guerchais-Roche GR-105
 Guerchais-Roche GR-107
 Guerchais 110 Avion Stratosphérique

Guerchais-Schwander 
 Guerchais-Schwander T-55

Guerpont
(Maurice Guerpont, Pulonu, France)
Guerpont Autoplum

Guggenmos
(Drachenbau Josef Guggenmos, Kaufbeuren, Germany)
Guggenmos Bullet
Guggenmos ESC

Guilie 
(Christian Guilie)
 Guilie CAP TR

Guillemin 
(Jean Guillemin)
 Guillemin Sportplane
 Guillemin JG.10
 Guillemin JG.40
 Guillemin JG.41
 Guillemin JG.42
 Guillemin JG.43

Guimbal
(Hélicoptères Guimbal)
 Guimbal G2 Cabri

Guizhou 
(Guizhou Aircraft Industry Corp.)
 Guizhou JJ-7
 Guizhou FT-7
 Guizhou JL-9
 Guizhou JL-9G
 EV-97
 Guizhou Soar Eagle
 Guizhou FTC-2000 Mountain Eagle
 Guizhou FTC-2000G

Guldentops 
(Etablissement Jef Guldentops)
 Bulté-Guldentops trainer
 Guldentops Saint Michel SG-2

Gulfstream 
 Gulfstream Aerospace C-4 Academe—Gulfstream
 Gulfstream Aerospace C-11 Gulfstream II
 Gulfstream Aerospace C-20 Gulfstream III
 Gulfstream Aerospace C-37 Gulfstream V
 Gulfstream Aerospace Gulfstream IV
 Gulfstream Aerospace Gulfstream V
 Gulfstream Aerospace Jetprop
 Gulfstream Aerospace Turbo Commander
 Gulfstream G100
 Gulfstream G200
 Gulfstream G400NG
 Gulfstream G550/IAI Eitam
 Gulfstream G650
 Gulfstream G700
 Gulfstream G750
 Gulfstream American AA-1C Lynx
 Gulfstream American AA-5A Cheetah
 Gulfstream American AA-5B Tiger
 Gulfstream American GA-7 Cougar
 Gulfstream American 112
 Gulfstream American 114
 Gulfstream American Hustler
 Gulfstream Peregrine
 Gulfstream Peregrine 600
 Gulfstream X-54

Gumieniuk
 Gumieniuk 1911 aircraft

Gunderson 
(Thomas Gunderson, Twin Valley, MN)
 Gunderson Model 1

Guritzer-van Nes 
(Guritzer & van Nes)
 Guritzer van Nes A.I
 Guritzer van Nes A.II
 Guritzer van Nes A.III

Guthier 
(Guthier Airplane Co Inc, 33 S Market St, Chicago, IL)
 Guthier H-249
 Guthier 1928 Monoplane

Guyard 
 Guyard 1911 Monoplane

Gweduck Aircraft
(Renton, WA)
Gweduck Aircraft Gweduck

GWH 
(G W Heinemann, Bellingham, WA)
 GWH Special

Gwinn 
((Joseph Marr) Gwinn Aircar Co, Buffalo, NY)
 Gwinn Aircar

Gyro-Cycle 
(Wayne University, Detroit, MI)
 Gyro-Cycle 1936 Human-powered Helicopter

Gyro-Kopp-Ters
(Gyro-Kopp-Ters, Lake City, FL)
Gyro-Kopp-Ters Midnight Hawk
Gyro-Kopp-Ters Twin Eagle

Gyrodyne
(Gyrodyne Co of America (Pres: Peter J Papadakos), Hicksville, NY)
 Gyrodyne GCA-2
 Gyrodyne GCA-5 Gyrodyne
 Gyrodyne GCA-7 Helidyne
 Gyrodyne Model GCA-55 (actually an air-cushion vehicle - added for completeness)
 Gyrodyne GCA-59 Rotorcycle
 Gyrodyne QH-50 DASH (DASH - destroyer anti-submarine helicopter)
 Gyrodyne HOG
 Gyrodyne DSN
 Gyrodyne RON

Gyroflug
 Gyroflug Speed Canard

Gyropter 
(American Gyropter Co, Cincinnati, OH)
 Gyropter 1928 Autogyro

Gyroplane
(Pennsylvania Aircraft Syndicate Ltd. / E. Burke Wilford)
 Gyroplane XOZ-1

Gyroplane
(Société Français du Gyroplane)
 Gyroplane G-20

GyroTec
(GyroTec Michael Obermaier, Wörth am Rhein, Germany)
GyroTec DF02

_

References

Further reading

 List of aircraft (Go-Gz)

fr:Liste des aéronefs (E-H)